Bernardo Alejandro Leyenda (born 26 March 1980 in Buenos Aires) is a retired Argentine football goalkeeper.
He played for River Plate of the Primera Division Argentina in 2006/2008, but never played any games. In January 2008, he was transferred to Racing but he also failed to make an appearance for La Academia.
Leyenda has kept goal for Vélez Sársfield, Banfield and Independiente as well as Leganés in the Spanish Segunda División.

External links
 Racing Club player profile
 Argentine Primera statistics

1980 births
Living people
Footballers from Buenos Aires
Argentine footballers
Argentine expatriate footballers
Argentine expatriate sportspeople in Spain
Association football goalkeepers
Club Atlético Vélez Sarsfield footballers
CD Leganés players
Club Atlético Banfield footballers
Club Atlético River Plate footballers
Racing Club de Avellaneda footballers
Nacional Potosí players
Defensa y Justicia footballers
San Martín de Tucumán footballers
Club Atlético Independiente footballers
Argentine Primera División players
Expatriate footballers in Bolivia
Expatriate footballers in Spain